Aymanam John (born 10 April 1953) is a Malayalam–language short-story writer. He hails from Aymanam, a small village in Kerala's Kottayam district which was made famous by Arundhati Roy through her 1997 novel The God of Small Things.

Writings
John has also written several stories of this village including a collection of memoirs titled Ennittumundu Thaamarappoikakal, where he narrates his native place, the scenic countryside, the people and places and moments that he cherishes. His other famous books include Ithara Characharangalude Charitrapusthakam, Christmas Marathinte Veru and Aymanam Johninte Kathakal (which won the 2017 Odakkuzhal Award). He received the 2017 Kerala Sahitya Akademi Award for Story.

References

1953 births
Living people
Writers from Kerala
People from Kottayam district
Indian male short story writers
Malayalam-language writers
Malayalam short story writers
20th-century Indian short story writers
20th-century Indian male writers